Back the Way We Came: Vol. 1 (2011–2021) is a compilation album by English rock band Noel Gallagher's High Flying Birds. It was released on 11 June 2021 by Sour Mash Records. The album was curated and compiled by Noel Gallagher. The standard 2-CD version of the album includes tracks from the band's first three albums, Noel Gallagher's High Flying Birds (2011), Chasing Yesterday (2015) and Who Built the Moon? (2017), and the three EPs Black Star Dancing (2019), This Is the Place (2019) and Blue Moon Rising (2020), plus two previously unreleased tracks, "We're on Our Way Now" and "Flying on the Ground", the former of which was released as a single the same day as the announcement of the album, on 29 April 2021. A deluxe edition includes a third CD of alternative versions, instrumental versions and remixes of various tracks.

In an interview with Apple Music, Gallagher said that Best of Bee Gees is one of his favourite albums and that it inspired the cover of Back the Way We Came.

Critical reception 

Back the Way We Came: Vol. 1 (2011–2021) received generally positive reviews from music critics.

Track listing

Charts

Weekly charts

Year-end charts

Certifications

References

External links
 

2021 greatest hits albums
Noel Gallagher's High Flying Birds albums